Mount Hibok-Hibok (also known as Catarman Volcano) is a stratovolcano on Camiguin Island in the Philippines.  It is one of the active volcanoes in the country and part of the Pacific ring of fire.

Description

It has six hot springs (Ardent Spring, Tangob, Bugong, Tagdo, Naasag and Kiyab), three craters (Kanangkaan Crater, site of the 1948 eruption; Itum Crater, site of 1949 eruption, and Ilihan Crater, site of 1950 eruption).

There are also domes and cones at Campana Hill, Minokol Hill, Tres Marias Hill, Mount Carling, Mount Tibane, and Piyakong Hill.

Mount Timpoong and Hibok-Hibok form the two major landmarks within the Timpoong and Hibok-Hibok Natural Monument. The natural monument became an ASEAN Heritage Park in 2015.

The indigenous Kamigin Manobo are believed to be the original inhabitants of Mount Hibok-Hibok.

Eruptions
Hibok-Hibok has erupted four times in modern history.

The first recorded eruption occurred in 1827 and a similar activity followed in 1862.

Volcanic activity is currently monitored through solar-powered autonomous stations operated by the Hibok-Hibok Volcano Observatory under the Philippine Institute of Volcanology and Seismology.

1871 to 1875
On February 16, 1871, earthquakes and subterranean rumblings began to be felt on the island, which increased in severity until April 30 when a volcanic fissure opened up 400 yards southwest of the village of Catarman, on the northwest flank of Hibok-hibok Volcano. From the opening, lava was continuously ejected and poured into the sea for four years, destroying the town. At the same time, the vent built a cone now known as Mt. Vulcan.

The portion of the town containing a cemetery has subsided into the sea and is now marked with a huge white cross off the coast. The settlement was relocated to where the present Catarman town center is now located. The remains of old Catarman, including the ruins of the ancient Spanish church, convent and a bell tower, are now called Gui-ob.

1897 to 1902
In 1897, Mt. Hibok-Hibok emitted white sulfurous steam that damaged villages on the island. Solfataric activity continued up to 1902. In 1901, the volcano disappeared.

1948 to 1951
From 1948 to 1951, Mt. Hibok-Hibok constantly rumbled and smoked. There were also landslides and earthquakes followed by dome building and nuee ardente. The Peléan eruption in 1948 from the Kanangkaan crater caused little damage and loss of life. The eruption of 1949, originating from Itum crater caused 79 deaths due to landslides. In the morning of December 4, 1951, the volcano erupted again. All in all, over 3,000 people were killed. Before the eruption of Mt. Hibok-Hibok in 1951, the population of Camiguin had reached 69,000. After the eruption, the population was reduced to about 34,000 due to massive emigration.

Volcanologists observed an eruption pattern observed during the 1948–1952 eruptions (a cycle of four phases) beginning with a short period of emission of steam from the crater and avalanches of volcanic materials, followed by explosions or steam blast with emission of heavy clouds of steam, ash and other fragmentary volcanic materials with a strong possibility of the development of pyroclastic flows. The third phase involves eruption of incandescent materials, emission of ash and steam in large amounts, formation of flows and occasional minor crater outbursts, and finally a decrease in steam and other ejecta from the crater.

Hiking activity
Mt. Hibok-Hibok is a popular hiking destination in Camiguin island. A permit from the DENR office in Mambajao is required. It normally takes 3–5 hours to reach the summit; the usual jump-off is Ardent Hot Springs in Mambajao. Views from the summit include the nearby White Island, Bohol to the north, Eastern Mindanao to the east and the island of Siquijor to the west. The mossy crater of Camiguin's past eruption can also be seen.

Mt. Vulcan can be hiked by way of the Stations of the Cross or The Walkway in Bonbon, Catarman. On the trail are the statues depicting the Roman Catholic Stations of the Cross, which are 14 events in the crucifixion of Jesus, at intervals on the climb. They are a memorial to the dead from the last eruption in the 1950s.  Mt. Vulcan, which is locally called the Old Volcano, is a misnomer as it is actually the youngest volcano on the island, formed in the 1871 eruption.

See also 
 List of active volcanoes in the Philippines
 List of potentially active volcanoes in the Philippines
 List of inactive volcanoes in the Philippines
 Philippine Institute of Volcanology and Seismology

References

External links 
 
 Philippine Institute of Volcanology and Seismology (PHIVOLCS) Mount Hibok-Hibok Page

Stratovolcanoes of the Philippines
Subduction volcanoes
Volcanoes of Mindanao
Mountains of the Philippines
Active volcanoes of the Philippines
Landforms of Camiguin
Holocene stratovolcanoes